Jawahar Tunnel, also called Qazigund Tunnel is a road tunnel in Indian union territory of Jammu and Kashmir. Named after the first Prime Minister of India Jawaharlal Nehru, it was constructed for round-the-year surface transport between 1954 and 1956. The Jawahar tunnel has been operational since 22 December 1956. It has one lane road in either direction. It is situated between Banihāl and Qazigund on NH 1A that has been renumbered NH 44. The tunnel facilitates round-the-year road connectivity between Srinagar and Jammu.

The tunnel was constructed by Alfred Kunz and C. Barsel of Germany between 1954 and 1960. The tunnel was renovated by the Border Roads Organization under the project BEACON in 1960. It was designed for 150 vehicles per day in each direction but the number of vehicles is now 7,000 in both directions. After renovation, the tunnel now has a two-way ventilation system, pollution & temperature sensors, lighting system and with emergency phones for any assistance installed from Border Roads Organization. 

It is guarded by military round the clock. Photography or videography inside or nearby the tunnel is strictly prohibited.  Once the vehicle enters the tunnel, it has to maintain the same speed throughout the tunnel. CCTVs are installed in the tunnel for continuous monitoring.

Until 2009, the tunnel was closed for civilian traffic between midnight and 08:00. It is now open 24 hours a day.
A new, higher-capacity, all-weather tunnel (Qazigund Tunnel) dug in May 2018 reduced the traffic through the Jawahar tunnel and also reduced the distance of 16 km from Jammu to Srinagar, which opened for traffic in June 2021.

See also
 Nandni tunnels
 Pir Panjal Railway Tunnel
 Banihal Qazigund Road Tunnel
 Atal Tunnel

References

Road tunnels in Jammu and Kashmir
Tunnels completed in 1956
1956 establishments in Jammu and Kashmir
Ramban district
Anantnag district